The Tuchengzi Formation (formerly known as Tucheng Conglomerate, from ) is a geological formation in China whose strata span the Tithonian (Late Jurassic) to Berriasian (Early Cretaceous) ages. Dinosaur fossils, particularly footprints, have been found from the formation.

Fossil content

The Tuchengzi Formation was deposited during a time of transition between the Daohugou Biota and the Jehol biota. The Tuchengzi represents a poorer, more arid climate that appears to have caused much of the Daohugou fauna to become extinct. They would later be replaced by the Jehol biota when conditions became more favorable to a diversity of terrestrial animal life.

Reptiles
Indeterminate sauropod remains formerly attributed to the Mamenchisauridae and Brachiosauridae have been found in Liaoning, China. Theropod tracks, including those made by avialans, have been found in Liaoning, China.

Plants

See also 
 List of dinosaur-bearing rock formations

References 

Geologic formations of China
Jurassic System of Asia
Lower Cretaceous Series of Asia
Cretaceous China
Jurassic China
Tithonian Stage
Berriasian Stage
Shale formations
Sandstone formations
Mudstone formations
Fluvial deposits
Ichnofossiliferous formations
Paleontology in Liaoning